Live at Charlotte's Web is a live album by American folk and blues guitarist Peter Lang, recorded March 26, 2004.

This 2-CD, 1-DVD package was recorded live at the club, Charlotte's Web, in Rockford, Illinois.

Track listing
All songs by Peter Lang unless otherwise noted.
 "Daylight Is Darkkness" – 2:53
 "Drifting Away" – 3:08
 "Farewell Maximillian" – 2:40
 "Fatback & Greens" – 2:01
 "Future Shot at the Rainbow" – 5:07
 "Going Down the China Road" (Lang, Traditional) – 3:51
 "Green Apple Quickstep" – 2:02
 "Two Steps Forward, One Step Back" – 4:15
 "When Kings Come Home" – 4:12
 "That Will Never Happen No More/Angel of Baffin's Bay" – 3:09
 "Wide Oval Rip-Off" – 2:57
 "My Dear Mary Anne" – 3:28
 "Young Man, Young Man, Look at Your Shoes" – 2:55
 "Halloween Blues/That's All Right Medley" (Lang, Dave Ray) – 5:47
 "Adair's Song" – 1:37
 "Back to the Wall" – 2:23
 "Colored Aristocracy" (Traditional) – 1:50
 "Country Blues Medley" (Traditional) – 3:06
 "Guitar Rag" (Sylvester Weaver, Traditional) – 2:06
 "I Should Have Known" – 2:36
 "Jimmy Bell" (Cat Iron, Lang) – 3:00
 "Living in the Weeds" – 2:54
 "Quetico Reel/Poor Howard" (Lang, Lead Belly) – 3:02
 "R. C. Rag" – 2:51
 "Red Meat on the Road" – 4:34
 "Round Worm Reel/Snow Toad" – 3:15
 "St. Charles Shuffle" – 2:50
 "There Will Be a Happy Meeting In Heaven Tonight" (Adger M. Pace) – 2:10
 "Toth's Song" – 6:01
 "Turnpike Terror" – 2:29

Personnel
Peter Lang – guitar, vocals

Peter Lang (guitarist) albums
2007 live albums
2007 video albums
Live video albums